Sha (majuscule: Շ; minuscule: շ; Armenian: շա) is the twenty-third letter of the Armenian alphabet, representing the voiceless postalveolar fricative in both Eastern and Western Armenian. It is typically romanized with the digraph Sh. It was part of the alphabet created by Mesrop Mashtots in the 5th century CE. In the Armenian numeral system, it has a value of 500.

Character codes

See also
 Nu, the letter preceding Sha in the Armenian alphabet
 Armenian alphabet

References

External links
 Շ on Wiktionary
 շ on Wiktionary

Armenian letters
Armenian alphabet